The Paramount Pictorial was a series of scenic films produced by J. C. Williamson Ltd out of their studio in Melbourne.

References

Australian anthology films